Joseph Paul Tamatea Moody (born 18 September 1988) is a New Zealand rugby union footballer who plays as a prop for the Crusaders in Super Rugby and Canterbury in the ITM Cup. He made his debut for New Zealand in 2014 and has since won 46 international caps.

Early life
Moody was born in Christchurch. He is affiliated to the Ngāi Tahu Māori tribe and grew up on Tuahiwi Marae.

Rugby union career
Moody started playing rugby league at a young age and aspired to play for the Kiwis over the ABs, until the high-school rugby changed that. He played rugby at Woodend rugby club at a young age and later Lincoln Rugby Club where he still plays for the Senior Rugby team between representative rugby for Canterbury and the All Blacks.

He was a member of the  Wider Training Squad for the 2013 Super Rugby season and was subsequently promoted to the senior squad for the 2013 season. He was included in the All Blacks squad for the 2013 Rugby Championship as cover for injured Crusaders' teammate Wyatt Crockett. Moody was named in New Zealand's 31-man squad for the 2015 Rugby World Cup where he played in the knockout stages. Moody eventually supplanted Crockett as the first-choice loosehead prop in 2016 when he was named in the All Blacks again.

Moody was a member of the Māori All Blacks in 2015.

Moody was warned for a dangerous tackle in 2016 and was yellow-carded twice in the 2016–17 international season including for a spear tackle.

Moody played in the 2019 Rugby World Cup in Japan, playing in five of their six tests during the competition. Moody started in all three of the knockout rounds for New Zealand, including their 7–19 loss to England in the semi-final.

List of international test tries 

Updated: 16 December 2019
Source:

Wrestling career
Moody wrestled from a young age until he was 21. He won several national titles.

Statistics

References

External links

1988 births
Living people
New Zealand rugby union players
New Zealand international rugby union players
Canterbury rugby union players
Crusaders (rugby union) players
Rugby union props
Rugby union players from Christchurch
Māori All Blacks players
Ngāi Tahu people
People educated at Christ's College, Christchurch
Lincoln University (New Zealand) alumni
21st-century American politicians
New Zealand male sport wrestlers